Ledbury Town Football Club is a football club based in Ledbury, Herefordshire, England.

History
Ledbury Town joined the West Midlands (Regional) League in 1974. Four years later, despite only finishing fifth, they were promoted to the Premier Division ahead of higher placed teams due to the quality of the facilities at their New Street ground. After finishing second from bottom in 1983, they dropped out of the league and played only local football for the next 8 years.

In 1991 they joined the Midland Combination, initially in Division One, but the following season they finished bottom and dropped into Division Two, where they remained until 1999 when they decided to switch leagues and return to the West Midlands (Regional) League, initially in Division One (South). In 2001, despite having one point deducted due to an irregularity, they finished as champions and were promoted to the Premier Division.

A high point in the club's history came in November 2003 when they played Manchester United in a benefit game for a local family who had lost several relatives in a motorway crash. A strong United side ran out 4–2 victors at New Street.

The club pulled out of the West Midlands (Regional) League in late 2014 and closed down completely in January 2015. However, they reformed in summer 2015, and now play in the Herefordshire Football League.

Ground
New Street boasts two stands, including a dedicated away seating area, as well as a club house.  It backs onto the town's cemetery.

Honours
West Midlands Regional League
Division One Champions 2000–01
Herefordshire League
Premier Division Champions 2011–12
Herefordshire County Challenge Cup
Winners 2006–07, 2009–10
Herefordshire Charity Bowl
Winners 2011–12, 2018-19

Records
Best FA Cup performance: Extra preliminary round, 2007–08, 2008–09
Best FA Vase performance: Fourth Round, 2004–05

References

External links
Official website

Football clubs in Herefordshire
Association football clubs established in 1893
Association football clubs disestablished in 2015
1893 establishments in England
West Midlands (Regional) League
Midland Football Combination
Herefordshire Football League
Ledbury